Manjeshwaram taluk  is the northern most taluk of Kerala which borders Karnataka state. It is located in Kasaragod district, Kerala which was carved out from Kasaragod taluk on 2013.

Constituent villages
Manjeshwaram taluk has 48 revenue villages.
 Manjeshwaram Panchayat: Kunjathur, Hosabettu, Udyavar(Manjeshwaram CT), Hosangadi, Badaje
 Meenja Panchayat: Meenja, Kadambar, Koliyoor, Kaliyoor, Talakala, Kuloor, Majibail, Moodambail
 Vorkady Panchayat: Vorkady, Pavoor, Kodalamogaru, Pathur
 Paivalike Panchayat: Paivalike, Chippar, Bayar, Kayyar, Kudalmarkala
 Enmakaje Panchayat: Enmakaje, Sheni, Padre, Kattukukke 
 Puthige Panchayat: Edanad, Badoor, Kannur, Puthige, Angadimogaru, Mugu
 Kumbla Panchayat: Kumbla, Ichilampady, Mogral, Bombrana, Arikady, Kidoor, Ujarulvar,
 Mangalpady Panchayat: Uppala, Mannamkuzhi, Ichilangod, Mangalpady, Pathwadi, Bekoor, Heroor, Shiriya and Kubanoor

See also
Koliyoor
Manjeshwar Assembly constituency

References

Taluks of Kerala
Geography of Kasaragod district